Ariel Osvaldo Cozzoni  (born 21 January 1964) is a former Argentine football striker. He played club football in Argentina, France and Mexico.

Cozzoni started his professional playing career in 1985 with Newell's Old Boys. He was loaned to Instituto de Córdoba for the 1988–1989 season, but returned in 1990 to help Newell's to win the 1990–1991 championship. During the season, he was the league's top goalscorer with 23 goals.

After the 1991 season, he joined OGC Nice in France and then went on to play for Toluca in Mexico before returning to Newell's in 1993.

In 1994, Cozzoni joined Club Atlético Banfield, but left later that year to join Central Córdoba in the Argentine 2nd division where he played until 1996.

Titles

References

1964 births
Living people
Footballers from Rosario, Santa Fe
Argentine footballers
Argentine expatriate footballers
Association football forwards
C
Instituto footballers
OGC Nice players
Ligue 1 players
Deportivo Toluca F.C. players
Club Atlético Banfield footballers
Central Córdoba de Rosario footballers
O'Higgins F.C. footballers
Argentine Primera División players
Liga MX players
Expatriate footballers in Chile
Expatriate footballers in France
Expatriate footballers in Mexico
Argentine expatriate sportspeople in France
Argentine expatriate sportspeople in Mexico